Ruben Schott (born 8 July 1994) is a German professional volleyball player. He is a member of the Germany national team. At the professional club level, he plays for Berlin Recycling Volleys.

Honours

Clubs
 CEV Cup
  2015/2016 – with Berlin Recycling Volleys
 National championships
 2013/2014  German Championship, with Berlin Recycling Volleys
 2015/2016  German Cup, with Berlin Recycling Volleys
 2015/2016  German Championship, with Berlin Recycling Volleys
 2016/2017  German Championship, with Berlin Recycling Volleys
 2021/2022  German SuperCup, with Berlin Recycling Volleys
 2021/2022  German Championship, with Berlin Recycling Volleys
 2022/2023  German SuperCup, with Berlin Recycling Volleys
 2022/2023  German Cup, with Berlin Recycling Volleys

Individual awards
 2015: German SuperCup – Most Valuable Player
 2021: Polish Championship – Best Receiver

References

External links

 
 Player profile at LegaVolley.it 
 Player profile at PlusLiga.pl 
 Player profile at Volleybox.net

1994 births
Living people
Volleyball players from Berlin
German men's volleyball players
German expatriate sportspeople in Italy
Expatriate volleyball players in Italy
German expatriate sportspeople in Poland
Expatriate volleyball players in Poland
Trefl Gdańsk players
AZS Olsztyn players
Outside hitters